Tonge may refer to:

People
Tonge (surname)

Places in England
Tonge, Bolton, an outlying area of Bolton in Greater Manchester
River Tonge, a river in Greater Manchester
Tonge, Middleton, an area of Middleton in Greater Manchester
Tonge, Kent, a village in the borough of Swale in Kent
Tonge, Leicestershire

See also
 John Tonge Centre, a mortuary in Queensland, Australia
 The following towns in the Netherlands:
 Nieuwe-Tonge
 Oude-Tonge
 Tong (disambiguation)